The designated hitter (DH) is a baseball player who bats in place of another position player, most commonly the pitcher. The position is authorized by Major League Baseball Rule 5.11. It was adopted by the American League in 1973 and later by the National League in 2022, making it universal in MLB. Within that time frame, nearly all amateur, collegiate, and professional leagues worldwide have adopted the designated hitter or some variant, with the notable exception of Nippon Professional Baseball's Central League.

Major League Baseball rule
The designated hitter is a player who does not play a position in the field, but instead replaces the pitcher in the batting order. However, a starting pitcher (and not relievers) may also opt starting as a designated hitter simultaneously, in such case the pitcher bat himself as the designated hitter. The DH may only be used for the pitcher (and not any other position player), as stated in Rule 5.11. Use of the DH is optional, but must be determined before the start of the game.

The designated hitter can be moved to a fielding position during the game. If the DH is moved to another position, his team forfeits the role of the designated hitter, and the pitcher or another player (the latter possible only in case of a multiple substitution) would bat in the spot of the position player replaced by the former DH. If the designated hitter is moved to pitcher, any subsequent pitcher (or pinch-hitter thereof) would bat should that spot in the batting order come up again (except for a further multiple substitution). Likewise, if a pinch-hitter bats for a non-pitcher, and then remains in the game as the pitcher, the team would forfeit the use of the DH for the remainder of the game, and the player who was DH would become a position player (or exit the game). 

The above case has an exception: If a starting pitcher started as a designated hitter simultaneously, that player will remain as DH to bat for his relievers after being replaced as pitcher, likewise remained as starting pitcher if he was pinch hit by a bench player who'd become the new designated hitter. Such exception was made by MLB in 2022 season, coincident with the introduction of the universal DH. It has been widely nicknamed the "Ohtani rule" as a nod to Shohei Ohtani, a star pitcher and hitter for the Los Angeles Angels who has sometimes batted for himself in the past, but had to leave games as hitter or move to another position on the field when relieved as pitcher due to the limitations of the old rule. The rule change was subsequently applied for International level games, starting from 2023 World Baseball Classic.

Unlike other positions, the DH is "locked" into the batting order. No multiple substitution may be made to alter the batting rotation of the DH. In other words, a double switch involving the DH and a position player (with the exception of players started as starting pitcher and designated hitter) is not legal. For example, if the DH is batting fourth and the catcher is batting eighth, the manager cannot replace both players so as to have the new catcher bat fourth and the new DH bat eighth. Once a team loses its DH under any of the scenarios discussed in the previous paragraph, the double switch becomes fully available, and may well be used via necessity, should the former DH be replaced in the lineup.

If a team did not begin a game with a DH, the team's pitchers (or pinch hitters) had to bat for the entire game.

Interleague play and exhibitions (until 2021) 

In Major League Baseball, during interleague play between 1997 and 2021, the DH rule was applied to a game based on the rules of the home team's league. If the game was played in an American League park, the designated hitter could be used; in a National League park, the pitcher must bat or else be replaced with a pinch-hitter. On June 12, 1997, San Francisco Giants outfielder Glenallen Hill became the first National League DH in a regular-season game, when the Giants met the American League's Texas Rangers at The Ballpark in Arlington in interleague play.

At first, the DH rule was not applied to the World Series. From 1973 to 1975, all World Series games were played under National League rules, with no DH and the pitchers required to bat. For 1976, it was decided the DH rule would apply to all games in a World Series, regardless of venue, but only in even-numbered years. Cincinnati Reds first baseman Dan Driessen became the first National League player to act as a DH in any capacity (regular season or postseason) when he was listed as the DH in the first game (he was the DH in all four Series games that year). This practice lasted through 1985. Beginning in 1986, the DH rule was used in games played in the stadium of the American League representative.

There was initially no DH in the All-Star Game. Beginning in 1989, the rule was applied only to games played in American League stadiums.  During this era, if the All-Star Game was scheduled for an American League stadium, fans would vote in the DH for the American League's starting lineup, while the National League's manager decided that league's starting DH. Since 2010, the designated hitter has been used by both teams regardless of where the game is played.

For the 2021 All-Star Game, MLB granted an exception to the normal designated hitter rule because the Los Angeles Angels' Shohei Ohtani was selected as both starting designated hitter and starting pitcher. Ohtani started the game as both a pitcher and the DH and was replaced as pitcher after one inning but remained in the game as the DH without the American League having to forfeit the use of a DH. The American League would have lost the DH if either Ohtani, or a player replacing him at DH, had played a position in the field other than pitcher.

Background and history
The rationale for the designated hitter rule arose comparatively early in the history of professional baseball. It was observed that, with a few exceptions—most notably Babe Ruth, who began his career as a pitcher with the Boston Red Sox—pitchers are usually selected for the quality of their pitching, not their hitting, and that most pitchers were weak hitters who had to be batted ninth in the batting order and pinch-hit for late in games when their team was trailing. The designated hitter idea was raised by Philadelphia Athletics manager Connie Mack in 1906, though he was not the first to propose it. Mack's proposal received little support, but the notion did not die. In the late 1920s, National League president John Heydler made a number of attempts to introduce a 10th-man designated hitter as a way to speed up the game, and almost convinced National League clubs to agree to try it during spring training in 1929.

However, momentum to implement the DH did not pick up until the pitching dominance of the late 1960s. In 1968, Denny McLain won 31 games and Bob Gibson had a 1.12 ERA, while Carl Yastrzemski led the American League in hitting with only a .301 average. In addition, in 1969 spring training, both the American League and National League agreed to try the designated pinch hitter (DPH), but they did not agree on the implementation. Most NL teams chose not to participate. However, a four-year trial in which the International League and four other minor leagues started using the DH for their games began that year. The American League allowed its use in spring training in 1971.

Like other experimental baseball rule changes of the 1960s and 1970s, the DH was embraced by Oakland Athletics owner Charlie O. Finley. On January 11, 1973, Finley and the other American League owners voted 8–4 to approve the designated hitter for a three-year trial run. Three months later on April 6, Ron Blomberg of the New York Yankees became the first designated hitter in MLB history, facing Boston Red Sox right-hander Luis Tiant in his first plate appearance. "Boomer" Blomberg was walked on five pitches with the bases loaded in the first inning. As expected, the American League posted a higher batting average than the National League in 1973, which has continued every season since.

In response to increases in American League attendance because of the designated hitter, the National League held a yes/no vote on August 13, 1980, to determine whether or not the league would adopt the designated hitter. A majority of the twelve member teams was necessary to pass the rule, and the measure was expected to pass. However, when the teams were informed that the rule would not come into effect until the 1982 season, Philadelphia Phillies vice president Bill Giles was unsure of how the team owner, Ruly Carpenter, wanted him to vote. Unable to contact Carpenter, who was on a fishing trip, Giles was forced to abstain from voting. Prior to the meeting, Harding Peterson, general manager for the Pittsburgh Pirates, was told to side with the Phillies however they voted. The final tally was four teams voting for the DH (the Atlanta Braves, New York Mets, St. Louis Cardinals, and San Diego Padres), five votes against (the Chicago Cubs, Cincinnati Reds, Los Angeles Dodgers, Montreal Expos, and San Francisco Giants), and three abstentions (the Phillies, Pirates, and Houston Astros). Five days after that meeting, the Cardinals fired their general manager, John Clairborne, who was the leading proponent for the adoption of the DH rule, and the National League never held another vote on the issue.

As time passed, the designated hitter rule has enabled American League managers to consider multiple strategic options in setting their teams' lineups: they can rotate the DH role among part-time players (for example, using a left-handed batter against a right-handed pitcher and vice versa) or they can employ a full-time designated hitter against all pitchers. It also allows them to give a healthy everyday player a partial day off, or to give an injured player the opportunity to bat without exposing him to re-injury while playing in the field. , only a handful of players compiled over 400 at-bats as a DH each year.

When the Houston Astros moved to the American League in 2013, both leagues now had fifteen teams each. This required interleague play season-round, as well as the Astros' use of the DH full-time. There was debate within MLB to unify the rules of the two leagues, with either the American League returning to its pre-1973 rules and having the pitcher hit, like the National League, or the National League adopting the DH.

In January 2016, MLB Commissioner Rob Manfred indicated that consideration was given to the National League adopting the DH for the 2017 season, when a new collective bargaining agreement would take effect. However, he later backtracked on this statement to say that he does not see unification coming any time soon. Accordingly, the DH rule was not adopted by the National League at that time.

In 2020, the National League used the DH for the first time in its history as a health and safety measure due to impacts of the COVID-19 pandemic. At least one of the proposals released during negotiations between MLB and the Major League Baseball Players' Association (MLBPA) to attempt to reach an agreement regarding the season structure included a universal DH for 2021 as well, but the lack of such an agreement led to a temporary return to pitchers hitting in that year.

On April 4, 2021, an American League team voluntarily declined to use a designated hitter in their starting lineup for the first time since 1976, when the Los Angeles Angels placed their starting pitcher Shohei Ohtani second in the batting order. This was also the first time since 1903 that a pitcher had been listed as the second hitter in the starting lineup.

On June 23, 2021, Ohtani made history again when for the first time ever an AL team did not use the designated hitter and an NL team did. His Los Angeles Angels declined the DH privilege, while the visiting San Francisco Giants opted to use it, starting Alex Dickerson at DH.

On February 10, 2022, Manfred announced plans for a universal DH in the 2022 season. This was ratified as part of a new collective bargaining agreement with the Major League Baseball Players Association (MLBPA) on March 10, 2022.

Awards
The Baseball Writers' Association of America presents an annual award to the most outstanding designated hitter of the season, called the Edgar Martínez Award. Renamed for the former Seattle Mariners DH after his retirement in 2004, the Outstanding DH Award was introduced in 1973 and has been handed out every season since, except 1994 due to a players' strike. Notable winners include Edgar Martínez (five times) and David Ortiz (eight times, five consecutively).

DHs have generally not made much impact on the Major League Baseball Most Valuable Player Award or National Baseball Hall of Fame voting, because of the relative rareness of the full-time DH and the fact that the DH does not contribute on defense.

In 2021, Shohei Ohtani became the first everyday DH to win league MVP honors, having played in 126 of 155 games (81.29%) at DH. However, Ohtani's MVP season was mainly due to his success as a two-way player, having also logged 23 games as a pitcher and seven games in the outfield. 

During the 1993 season Paul Molitor became the first player to win the World Series Most Valuable Player Award. while playing 137 of 160 games (85.63%) as a designated hitter. Hideki Matsui (2009), David Ortiz (2013), and Jorge Soler (2021) were the only other designated hitters to win World Series MVP. Soler was also the only DH to win the award while a member of a National League team, having played for the Atlanta Braves in their World Series-winning season. In games played on National League parks, Ortiz and Molitor played games at first base, while Soler played in right field in their World Series MVP seasons. On the other hand, Matsui became the only World Series MVP to never play the field that season, as he came in as a pinch hitter in the pitcher's spot but was never moved to a fielding position via a double switch during games played in a National League park. Ortiz was also the first designated hitter to win the ALCS MVP in 2004, followed by Delmon Young in 2012, and Yordan Álvarez in 2021.

Among Hall of Famers, Paul Molitor and Jim Rice were, until 2014, the only inductees to even have played at least 25% of their games at DH. In 2014, Frank Thomas became the first Hall of Famer who played the majority of his games at DH. In 2019, Edgar Martínez and Harold Baines were inducted into the Hall of Fame. Martinez played over 70% of his games at DH. Baines played 1,643 of his 2,830 games at DH; he played only 63 games in the field between 1989 and the end of his career in 2001. In 2022, David Ortiz became the first full-time DH to be elected to the Hall of Fame on his first ballot. Ortiz played 2,028 of his 2,306 career games (88%) at DH.

Debate
There is considerable debate on the merits of the designated hitter rule. As noted above, the original rationale was to replace pitchers in the batting order because they were generally considered weak hitters, and usually batted ninth or pinch-hit for late in games when their team was trailing.

Critics often argue that use of the designated hitter introduces an asymmetry to the game by separating players into classes, creating offensive and defensive specialization more akin to American football. They believe the rule effectively separates pitchers, other fielders, and designated hitters into separate roles that never cross, possibly causing issues with promoting 'batting cage' players whose scope of experience is extremely limited. However, when the pitcher bats alongside everyone else, all nine players must take turns at the plate and in the field, and the hybridization of roles requires that everyone knows other roles in addition to their own.

The designated hitter rule also changes managerial strategy in late innings. In the National League, a manager had to decide when to let a pitcher bat or remove him, as well as with whom to pinch-hit and where or if that player should take the field afterward. When the decision to remove a pitcher is made, the manager may also elect to double switch, delaying the new pitcher's turn at bat. A designated hitter reduces the need for late-inning pinch hitters.

Advocates of the designated hitter point to the fact that it has extended many careers, and, in a few cases, created long, productive careers for players who are weak fielders or have a history of injuries, such as Cecil Fielder and David Ortiz. Hall of Fame members George Brett, Carl Yastrzemski, Paul Molitor, Harold Baines and Edgar Martínez continued their careers longer than they ordinarily would have without the rule. Barry Bonds, who spent his entire career in the National League and actually won eight Gold Gloves earlier in his career, was used strictly as a DH later in his career when the San Francisco Giants played away interleague games because of his diminishing fielding skills. Some believe that extending careers of older players is less of an advantage and more of a disadvantage, filling spots that otherwise may have been taken by younger players who end up not finding a place in the major leagues.

Prior to the introduction of the universal DH, interleague play added a new wrinkle to the controversy. Some feel that due to the DH, the American League team always had the advantage. The NL team had to use a bench player as the DH when the game is played in an AL park. Even though the AL team had to play without their DH in NL parks, that left them with a starting player available to pinch-hit and/or come in as a substitute player later in the game, as opposed to a bench player on the NL team. Major League Baseball Commissioner Bud Selig once proposed that the road team's rules should be followed for interleague games in order to combat this advantage for the home team, but the idea never received traction.

The decline of pitcher Chien-Ming Wang due to an interleague game injury has been cited in support of the designated hitter. On June 15, 2008, Wang, at the time one of the Yankees' best pitchers, was taken out of an interleague game versus the Houston Astros due to a right foot injury he sustained while running the bases, something he was not used to doing, since pitchers do not bat in the American League. Wang was diagnosed with a torn Lisfranc ligament and a partial tear of the peroneus longus of the right foot. The cast was removed on July 29, but the extensive rehabilitation process prevented Wang from being an effective pitcher at the major league level since. Yankees part-owner Hank Steinbrenner showed frustration with pitchers having to bat in the National League and suggested that the League "join the modern age".

Outside of Major League Baseball

Minor League Baseball
The DH is used for all Minor League Baseball (MiLB) games. Prior to the adoption of the DH by the National League in 2022, only Rookie and Single-A level leagues used the DH rule in all games, while Double-A and Triple-A games, when both teams were National League affiliates the designated hitter was not used. The reason for the difference was that as players get closer to reaching the majors, teams preferred to have the rules mimic those of the major league teams for which the players may soon be playing.

The Atlantic League, an independent minor league that became an MLB Partner League after the 2021 MiLB reorganization, is implementing an experimental "double-hook rule" for its 2021 season. Under this rule, once a team removes its starting pitcher it loses the right to use a DH for the rest of the game. The "double hook" rule was modified for the 2022 Atlantic League season. The change allows a team whose starting pitcher who goes at least five innings to keep its DH.

International baseball leagues
The DH is used in professional baseball except the Central League of Japan. When teams from different leagues play against each other in the Japan Series or interleague games, the DH rule is adopted if the Pacific League's team hosts the game.

Japan's Pacific League adopted the designated hitter in 1975, as did the Cuban National Series in 1977.

Amateur baseball
In American high schools and other amateur baseball leagues that use National Federation of State High School Associations (NFHS) rules, a DH may bat in place of one player in any position, not just a pitcher. Many coaches use a designated hitter in place of the weakest hitter in the lineup, if they use one at all. In amateur baseball, many pitchers are also good hitters and will often play another position (or even DH) when not pitching. 

In 2020, NFHS rules were modified to also add a "Player/DH" rule where a player may start the game with offensive and defensive roles, and be substituted out only on defense while remaining in the game on offense as a DH. 

Japanese high school baseball is one of the few amateur baseball leagues in the world that has never used the designated hitter rule at all. In high school baseball in South Korea, the rule has been adopted since 2004. American Legion rules, on the other hand, allow the DH only to bat for the pitcher; prior to 1995, the use of the DH was not allowed in Legion baseball at all.

In college baseball, NCAA rules state that the designated hitter must hit for the pitcher, but in many instances the pitcher is also a good hitter, and the coach may elect to let the pitcher bat in the lineup. If the pitcher opts to bat for himself, he is treated as two separate positions – a pitcher and a designated hitter (abbreviated P/DH on the lineup card) – and may be substituted for as such (i.e. if he is removed as the pitcher, he may remain as the designated hitter and vice versa). However, if a player who starts a game as a P/DH is relieved as the starting pitcher, he may not return to the mound even if he remains in the game as the DH, and he may not play any other defensive position after being relieved as the pitcher unless he immediately moves to another defensive position, in which case the new pitcher must assume the spot in the batting order of the fielder the P/DH substituted for, and the DH is lost for the remainder of the game. Conversely, a player who begins the game as the DH, but not as the pitcher, may come into the game as a reliever and remain as the DH (in effect becoming a P/DH), be relieved on the mound later in the game but continue to bat as the DH.

In Little League Baseball, the DH is not used except in the Senior League (age 13-16) division, where the DH can bat in place of any defensive player. However, a league may adopt a rule which requires all players present and able to play to be listed in the batting order (such that the order contains more than nine players), and thus all players will have a turn to bat even when they are not assigned a fielding position. Players in the batting lineup without a position on the field are given the position designation extra hitter (EH), a position seen occasionally in other amateur organizations (both youth and adult).

Sources

References

Further reading

External links
 Rule 6.10, the Designated Hitter Rule, from MLB's Official Rules
 The Etiology of Public Support for the Designated Hitter Rule, by Christopher Zorn and Jeff Gill, June 1, 2006
 The Designated Hitter as Moral Hazard, by Daniel H. Pink, December 12, 2004
The Designated Hitter's Place in Baseball

Batting (baseball)
Baseball positions
Baseball rules

Major League Baseball controversies
Baseball terminology